Cut-to-length logging (CTL) is a mechanized harvesting system in which trees are delimbed and cut to length directly at the stump. CTL is typically a two-man, two-machine operation with a harvester felling, delimbing, and bucking trees and a forwarder transporting the logs from the felling to a landing area close to a road accessible by trucks.

The capital costs for a typical CTL operation, with one harvester and one forwarder, are quite high. The price of a pair of machines alone are approx. US$1,000,000.

CTL is the primary logging method in European countries, while full-tree logging and the even older technique of tree-length logging are more popular in North America and less developed countries, where tree sizes can exceed the capacity of the harvester's felling head, i.e., tree stems with a butt diameter of over 90 centimeters. CTL lends itself to timber harvesting in plantation forestry where stems are often harvested before they reach large dimensions.

Advantages compared to full-tree logging
Cleaner wood since the logs are not skidded on the ground to the landing (in tree length more than full tree)
More fresh wood (in tree length more than full tree)
Less damage to retained trees in thinning operations
Typically requires fewer types of machines in an operation
No need to clear large landings close to the road
Greater personnel safety due to enclosed/protected machine cabs
More environmentally friendly due to:
less soil disturbance than in skidding operations (if improper skidding practices take place) 
no slash dumped at the landing
higher retention of foliar nutrients within the harvested area

Disadvantages compared to full-tree logging
Somewhat higher capital cost per volume when used in large scale clear cuts
Use of more advanced technology requires more operator knowledge and training

References

Logging